Land (1975–2002) is a two disc compilation album by Patti Smith, released on March 19, 2002, on Arista Records. Land (1975–2002) contains a collection of recordings from her eight previous albums on the first disc, along with B-sides and unreleased songs on the second disc. The album ranked number eight in Mojo's "Best Box Sets & Compilations of 2002". It is dedicated to the memory of Richard Sohl.

Track listing 

"Tomorrow" on Disc Two is unlisted.

Personnel 
 Patti Smith – vocals, guitar, clarinet
 Lenny Kaye – guitar
 Richard Sohl – keyboards
 Ivan Kral – bass guitar
 Jay Dee Daugherty – drums
 Bruce Brody – keyboards
 Tony Shanahan – bass guitar, keyboards
 Oliver Ray – guitar

Charts

Release history

Notes

External links 
 
 Land (1975–2002) at Sony BMG; now available on archive.org
 PattiSmithLand.com

Patti Smith albums
2002 compilation albums
Arista Records compilation albums